Dave McCulloch (born 12 October 1937) is a former Australian rules footballer who played with Carlton in the Victorian Football League (VFL).

Notes

External links 

Dave McCulloch's profile at Blueseum

1937 births
Carlton Football Club players
Living people
Australian rules footballers from Victoria (Australia)